The Georgia Gymdogs (officially the Georgia Bulldogs) is the women's gymnastics team of the University of Georgia. The team is part of NCAA Division I and competes in the Southeastern Conference (SEC). The Gymdogs compete in Stegeman Coliseum in Athens, Georgia.

The Gymdogs lead the nation with 10 NCAA Women's Gymnastics championship titles (including five consecutive wins from 2005–09) and 16 SEC championships. The team was coached by Suzanne Yoculan from 1983–2009 and by Jay Clark from 2009–12, Danna Durante from 2012-2017, and is currently coached by Courtney Kupets.

History
The women's gymnastics program was started in 1973 with Melinda Airhart as the head coach, and the team competed in the Association for Intercollegiate Athletics for Women (AIAW). After the 1979–80 season, the team began competing in the National Collegiate Athletic Association (NCAA) following the dissolution of the AIAW.

On July 1, 2009, Suzanne Yoculan retired after 26 years as head coach, and Clark, her assistant coach, took over as head of the program. In 2012, Clark was replaced by Durante.

Championships
As of 2012, the team had won 10 NCAA Women's Gymnastics championships. As of 2012, it had also won 16 Southeastern Conference titles (1986, '87, '91, '92, '93, '94, '96, '97, '98, '99, 2001, '02, '04, '05, '06, '08) and 22 NCAA regional titles.

NCAA individual event champions

As of the end of the 2016 season, 20 Georgia gymnasts have won a total of 42 individual event championships.

Coaches

Head coaching records
The team has had eight head coaches.

Other coaches currently working in the gym include Josh Overton, Jason Vonk, and Katie Heenan-Dodson.

Roster

Home venue
 Stegeman Coliseum

Past Olympians
 Hope Spivey (1988)
 Lori Strong  (1988, 1992)
 Courtney Kupets (2004)  
 Courtney McCool (2004) 
 Brittany Rogers  (2012)
 Megan Roberts  (2016 alternate)

See also

Georgia Bulldogs
Uga (mascot)

Notes

External links

Women's sports in the United States
Sports clubs established in 1973
1973 establishments in Georgia (U.S. state)